Philippe Mercier (also spelled Philip Mercier; 1689 – 18 July 1760) was an artist of French Huguenot descent from the German realm of Brandenburg-Prussia (later Kingdom of Prussia), usually defined to French school. Active in England for most of his working life, Mercier is considered one of the first practitioners of the Rococo style, and is credited with influencing a new generation of 18th-century English artists.

Life 
Mercier was born  in Berlin, the son of Pierre Mercier (died 1729, Dresden), a Huguenot tapestry-worker. He studied painting at the Akademie der Wissenschaften of Berlin and later under Antoine Pesne, who had arrived in Berlin in 1710.  Later, he travelled in Italy and France before arriving in London—"recommended by the Court at Hannover"—probably in 1716. He married in London in 1719 and lived in Leicester Fields.
  
He was appointed principal painter and librarian to the Prince and Princess of Wales at their independent establishment in Leicester Fields, and while he was in favour he painted various portraits of royalty, and no doubt many of the nobility and gentry. Of the royal portraits, those of the Prince of Wales and of his three sisters, painted in 1728, were all engraved in mezzotint by John Simon, and that of the three elder children of the Prince of Wales by John Faber the Younger in 1744. This last (entitled Playing Soldiers) was a typical piece of Mercier's composition, the children being made the subject of a spirited, if somewhat childish, allegory in their game of play. Prince George is represented with a firelock on his shoulder, teaching a dog his drill, while his little brother and sister are equally occupied in a scene that is aptly used to point a patriotic moral embodied in some verses subjoined to the plate, of which the concluding couplet is as follows:

Faber also engraved six plates of "Rural Life" after Mercier, and several other subjects of his have survived him.

In 1733, Mercier painted a Portrait of 'Frederick, Prince of Wales, playing a violoncello, and his Sisters'. National Portrait Gallery, London. There is an alternative version of the painting in the Royal Collection. In the painting 'The Sense of Hearing', 1744, women are playing violin, violoncello, harpsichord, and flute. Yale Collection for British Art.

Mercier became involved in a scandal of some sort and he lost favour.  He left London around 1740 and settled in York, where he practised portrait painting for over ten years, before returning to London in 1751. In 1752, Mercier went to Portugal at the request of several English merchants. He did not long remain there, however, but came back to London, where he died in 1760.

In August 2016, Mercier's painting Portrait of a Lady (1744) was one of the subjects for episode 19 in the 5th series of the BBC Television series Fake or Fortune?

Mercier's daughter Charlotte was also an artist in her early life, before turning to a life of dissolution and dying in the St James Workhouse two years after her father's death.

Gallery

References

Further reading

Primary sources
 
 
 
 
General studies
 
 
 
 
 
 
 
 
Exhibition catalogues
 
 
 
Additional notes
 
 
 
 
Reference books

External links

 Portraits by Philip Mercier at the National Portrait Gallery, London
 Paintings by Philip Mercier at Tate Britain
  Works by Mercier from Art.com
  Works by Mercier from Invaluable.com
John Ingamells archive

1689 births
1760 deaths
18th-century English painters
English male painters
English etchers
Huguenots
18th-century English male artists